The Lebanese–Syrian Security Apparatus is a network of intelligence officers and security leaders in Syria and Lebanon that is believed to have been the actual ruling power behind the government during the Syrian Hegemony period that ended in 2005.

See also
 Wissam al-Hassan

1990s in Lebanon
Intelligence agencies
Politics of Lebanon
Political organisations based in Lebanon
Lebanon–Syria relations
2000s in Lebanon